Popa Island (in Spanish: Isla Popa) is the second largest island in the Bocas del Toro Archipelago, Panama, with .

See also
List of islands of Panama

References

Caribbean islands of Panama